Chapter Two: Red (stylized in all lowercase) is the third extended play (EP) by American singer Bea Miller. It was released on June 2, 2017 by Hollywood Records. The EP is the second part of a trilogy of EPs, which follows the release of Chapter One: Blue on February 24, 2017, and precedes Chapter Three: Yellow, released on October 6, 2017. On February 23, 2018 the full album Aurora was released including all the songs of the three previous EPs, plus five new tracks.

Track listing 

Notes
 signifies a co-producer

Personnel 
Credits adapted from Qobuz.

Raphael Bautista – assistant recording engineer
Jorge Gutiérrez – assistant recording engineer
Trevor "Trevorious" Brown – composer, co-producer, songwriter
Warren "Oak" Felder – composer, engineer, producer, songwriter
Leah Haywood – composer, songwriter
Daniel James – composer, songwriter
Steph Jones – composer, songwriter
Bea Miller – composer, songwriter, vocals
Jarrad Rogers – composer, engineer, producer, songwriter, mixing
William Simons – composer, songwriter
Ido Zmishlany – composer, engineer, producer, songwriter
Zaire Koalo – co-production
Dreamlab – engineering, production, programming
Chris Gehringer – mastering
Erik Madrid – mixing
James Royo – mixing

Release history

References 

2017 EPs
Bea Miller albums
Hollywood Records EPs
Electropop EPs
EPs by American artists
Albums produced by Oak Felder